Real Avilés Club de Fútbol B was a Spanish football team based in Avilés, in the autonomous community of Asturias. Founded in 2006 and folded in 2018, it was the reserve team of Real Avilés.

History
Real Avilés had several reserve teams during its history, being Carbayedo CF the most important one, which played in Tercera División in the 1967–68 season. Other reserve teams did not pass the lowest division.

During the 1990s and the 2000s, Real Avilés agreed with several Asturian teams, especially with Navarro, collaboration agreements.

The last reserve team was reinstated in 2006 and promoted to Tercera División in 2013. Five years later, as a result of the serious crisis in the club, it was folded after being relegated to the last division.

Season to season

References

External links
Official website 
lapreferente.com 

Association football clubs established in 2006
Association football clubs disestablished in 2018
 
Spanish reserve football teams
Sport in Avilés
Football clubs in Asturias